Kim Woo-min (born August 24, 2001) is a South Korean swimmer.

Career
In July 2021, he represented South Korea at the 2020 Summer Olympics held in Tokyo, Japan. He competed in 4 × 200m freestyle relay event. The team did not advance to compete in the final.

References

External links
 
 

2001 births
Living people
South Korean male freestyle swimmers
Swimmers at the 2020 Summer Olympics
Olympic swimmers of South Korea
21st-century South Korean people